The men's tournament of football at the 2015 Summer Universiade was held from July 2 to 13 in Gwangju, South Korea.

Teams

Preliminary round

Group A

Group B

Group C

Group D

Classification round

Quarterfinal round

9th–16th place

Semifinal round

13th–16th place

9th–12th place

Elimination round

Quarterfinals

Semifinals

5th–8th place

1st–4th place

Final round
All of the following matches will be held on July 13, 2015. Only the gold-medal match will need 30 minutes extra time if two teams draw. Other matches will go directly to penalty shoot-outs  if the two teams tie.

15th-place game

13th-place game

11th-place game

9th-place game

7th-place game

5th-place game

Bronze-medal match

Gold-medal match

Final standings

References

External links
Official Website

football
Men's